Wyong Public School is a school situated on the Central Coast, north of Gosford, New South Wales. The township of Wyong was first established in 1887. The first Wyong School was opened on 2 July 1888 in temporary premises known as Watt's Concert Hall. In May 1889, the pupils moved to the Alison Road School. In September 1979, the new school opened at the present site in Cutler Drive, Wyong.

External links
 Wyong Public School

Public primary schools in New South Wales
Educational institutions established in 1888
1888 establishments in Australia
Wyong, New South Wales